The Ramsey Lewis Trio in Chicago is a live album by Ramsey Lewis Trio, recorded in 1960 and released on the Argo label.

Reception

AllMusic wrote: "One of pianist Ramsey Lewis' most satisfying jazz albums of his pre-The In Crowd days... The trio stretches out a little more during the live date than they did in the studio, and they seem inspired by the audience".

Track listing
 "Old Devil Moon" (Yip Harburg, Burton Lane)  – 3:56
 "What's New?" (Johnny Burke, Bob Haggart)  – 4:35
 "Carmen" (Georges Bizet)  – 3:56
 "Bei Mir Bist du Schön" (Sammy Cahn, Saul Chaplin, Jacob Jacobs, Sholom Secunda)  – 3:41
 "I'll Remember April" (Gene de Paul, Patricia Johnston, Don Raye)  – 3:17
 "Delilah" (Horatio Nicholls)  – 4:25
 "Folk Ballad" (Traditional)  – 6:16
 "But Not for Me" (George Gershwin, Ira Gershwin)  – 3:00
 "C. C. Rider" (Traditional)  – 3:51

Personnel 
Ramsey Lewis  – piano
El Dee Young  – bass
Issac "Red" Holt  – drums

References 

1960 live albums
Ramsey Lewis live albums
Argo Records live albums